Elisha Camp House is a historic home located at Sackets Harbor in Jefferson County, New York.  It was built about 1808–1815 and is a -story red brick building that is a remarkably well preserved example of an elegant Federal-style dwelling.  It features flat, geometric carving; Adamesque ornament; Palladian windows; elliptical fanlights; and a quality of reserve and refinement.

It was listed on the National Register of Historic Places in 1973.

References

External links
HOUNSFIELD HOMESTEADS : : Elisha Camp Mansion

Houses on the National Register of Historic Places in New York (state)
Federal architecture in New York (state)
Houses completed in 1815
Houses in Jefferson County, New York
National Register of Historic Places in Jefferson County, New York